Punk is an American four part documentary television series that ran from March 11 to April 1, 2019. on Epix.

Premise
Punk explores "the music, the fashion, the art and the DIY attitude of a subculture of self-described misfits and outcasts.". Each episode focuses on an individual era of punk, beginning with protopunk in the 1960s up until the present day.

Production
On December 10, 2018, it was announced that Epix had given the production a series order consisting of four episodes set to premiere on March 11, 2019. The series was expected to be directed by Jesse James Miller and executive produced by John Varvatos, Iggy Pop, and Derik Murray. Production companies involved with the series were slated to consist of Network Entertainment. Those interviewed in the series include Iggy Pop, Johnny Rotten, Marky Ramone, Debbie Harry, Chris Stein, Duff McKagan, Wayne Kramer, Jello Biafra, Flea, Dave Grohl, Danny Fields, Legs McNeil, and Penelope Spheeris, among others.

Episodes

References

External links
 

2010s American documentary television series
2019 American television series debuts
2019 American television series endings
English-language television shows
Television series by MGM Television
MGM+ original programming